The discography of Ayaka consists of six studio albums, two compilation albums, a cover album and numerous singles, released through Warner between 2006 and 2009, and through Ayaka's independent label, A Station, from 2012 onwards.

Studio albums

Compilation albums

Cover albums

Live albums

Singles

Promotional singles

Video albums

Notes

References

Discographies of Japanese artists
Pop music discographies
Discography